Maxime Aglago Awoudja (born 2 February 1998) is a German professional footballer who plays as a centre-back for Eredivisie club Excelsior. He has represented Germany at U19, U20, and U21 youth levels.

Career
Awoudja made his professional debut for VfB Stuttgart in the 2. Bundesliga on 26 July 2019, coming on as a substitute in the 35th minute for the injured Marcin Kamiński in the home match against Hannover 96. Four minutes later, he scored an own goal to reduce the lead for Stuttgart to 2–1.

On 31 January 2021, Awoudja was loaned to Türkgücü München until the end of the season.

On 31 August 2022, Awoudja signed with Excelsior.

Personal life
Awoudja was born in Munich, Bavaria and is of Togolese descent.

References

External links
 
 
 

1998 births
Living people
German people of Togolese descent
German footballers
Footballers from Munich
Association football central defenders
Germany youth international footballers
Germany under-21 international footballers
2. Bundesliga players
3. Liga players
Regionalliga players
Austrian Football Bundesliga players
FC Bayern Munich II players
VfB Stuttgart II players
VfB Stuttgart players
Türkgücü München players
WSG Tirol players
Excelsior Rotterdam players
German expatriate footballers
German expatriate sportspeople in Austria
Expatriate footballers in Austria
German expatriate sportspeople in the Netherlands
Expatriate footballers in the Netherlands